KPMI may refer to:

KPMI (AM), a radio station (1300 AM) licensed to serve Bemidji, Minnesota, United States
KPMI-FM, a radio station (94.5 FM) licensed to serve Baudette, Minnesota